(1552–1609) was a Sohei guardian-priest of the Hongan-ji.

Rairyū negotiated peace between the Honganji and Oda Nobunaga. It is known that Rairyū was very fond of tea ceremonies. Rairyū invited a master of tea, Tsuda Sōtatsu over to join him in a ceremony of tea.

1552 births
1609 deaths
Jōdo Shinshū Buddhist priests
Edo period Buddhist clergy